Love Is Hell is the debut album by British alternative rock band Kitchens of Distinction, first released in April 1989 by One Little Indian Records in the UK and A&M Records in the US. While the album earned KOD comparisons to bands like Echo & the Bunnymen and The Chameleons, the guitar soundscapes created by Julian Swales and the passionate lyrics and vocal delivery from Patrick Fitzgerald gave Kitchens of Distinction their own signature sound. The album also maintains a punkier sound than to be featured on the band's later albums. The 1993 CD edition of the album includes the band's 1989 Elephantine EP as 4 bonus tracks.

The album takes its title from the last line in "Hammer", a song about love gone wrong.

Track listing

Singles
"Prize" (October 1988)
 "Prize"
 "Concede"
 "Innocent"
"The 3rd Time We Opened the Capsule" (May 1989)
 "The 3rd Time We Opened the Capsule"
 "4 Men" (early version)
 "Into the Sea"
 "Prize" (Demo)
"Elephantine" EP (October 1989)
 "Elephantine"
 "Margaret's Injection"
 "The 1001st Fault"
 "Anvil Dub"

Personnel
Kitchens of Distinction 
 Patrick Fitzgerald – vocals, bass
 Julian Swales – guitar
 Dan Goodwin – drums
with:
 Anna Palm – violin on "Her Last Day in Bed"
Technical
 Barry Sage – engineer
 Sleeve design by Me Company
 Distributed by The Cartel

References

Kitchens of Distinction albums
1989 debut albums
One Little Independent Records albums